Donte Antonio Williams (born September 1, 1982) is an American football coach who is the defensive backs coach and defensive passing game coordinator at the University of Southern California (USC). He previously served as USC's associate head coach under Clay Helton, and he became USC's interim head coach on September 13, 2021 after Helton was fired. After leading the Trojans for the final 10 games of the 2021 season, Williams remained at the school on the staff of new head coach Lincoln Riley. A coach with stints at Oregon, Nebraska, Arizona, and San Jose State, Williams has established himself as one of the nation's top college football recruiters.

Williams played college football at Pasadena City College, Syracuse, and Idaho State before playing professionally in the AF2.

Coaching career

Early career
Williams began his coaching career in 2007 at Los Angeles Harbor College as their cornerbacks coach. He then went to serve in the same position at El Camino College in 2008. In 2009, Williams joined Mt. San Antonio College as their cornerbacks coach.

Nevada
In 2010, Williams was hired as a defensive quality control coach at the University of Nevada, Reno.

Washington
In 2011, Williams joined as a graduate assistant at the University of Washington.

San Jose State
In 2013, Williams was hired to be the cornerbacks coach at San Jose State University. In 2014, he was promoted to defensive backs coach and recruiting coordinator.

Arizona
In 2016, Williams joined the University of Arizona as their cornerbacks coach.

Nebraska
In 2017, Williams was hired to be the cornerbacks coach at the University of Nebraska–Lincoln.

Oregon
In 2018, Williams joined the University of Oregon as their cornerbacks coach under head coach Mario Cristobal.

USC
In 2020, Williams was hired as the defensive passing game coordinator and cornerbacks coach at the University of Southern California (USC) under head coach Clay Helton. In 2021, he was promoted to assistant head coach.

On September 13, 2021, Williams was named USC's interim head coach following Helton's dismissal. Williams became the first Black head coach in USC's football history. On September 18, 2021, Williams made his head coaching debut and led the Trojans to a 45-14 victory over Washington State. The Trojans went 3-7 under Williams during the program's worst season in 30 years.

Williams was retained on USC's staff by Riley in January 2022 as the Trojans' defensive backs coach and defensive passing game coordinator.

Head coaching record

Notes

References

External links 
 
 USC Trojans profile
 Syracuse Orange profile

1982 births
Living people
Sports coaches from Los Angeles
Players of American football from Los Angeles
Coaches of American football from California
American football defensive backs
Pasadena City Lancers football players
Syracuse Orange football players
Idaho State Bengals football players
Rio Grande Valley Dorados players
Arkansas Twisters players
El Camino Warriors football coaches
Mt. SAC Mounties football coaches
Nevada Wolf Pack football coaches
Washington Huskies football coaches
San Jose State Spartans football coaches
Arizona Wildcats football coaches
Nebraska Cornhuskers football coaches
Oregon Ducks football coaches
USC Trojans football coaches